The 1932 West Virginia Mountaineers football team was an American football team that represented West Virginia University as an independent during the 1932 college football season. In its second season under head coach Greasy Neale, the team compiled a 5–5 record and outscored opponents by a total of 137 to 115. The team played its home games at Mountaineer Field in Morgantown, West Virginia. Fred Schweitzer was the team captain.

Schedule

References

West Virginia
West Virginia Mountaineers football seasons
West Virginia Mountaineers football